Die (stylized as DIE) is a horror/fantasy comic book about role-playing games, influenced by the portal fantasy and LitRPG literary genres, written by Kieron Gillen and illustrated by Stephanie Hans. The series focuses on a group of British adults who are drawn back to an icosahedron-shaped world they originally visited as teenagers; the group left behind a friend upon their original escape and never discussed the experience. It was published by Image Comics and ran for twenty issues, beginning in December 2018 and ending in September 2021.

It won the British Fantasy Award for "Best Comic / Graphic Novel" in 2020 and 2021 and was a finalist for the Hugo Award in "Best Graphic Story or Comic" three times. Gillen and Hans also created a role-playing game adaptation of Die with British publisher Rowan, Rook and Deckard; the game was successively funded via Kickstarter in May 2022 and the digital edition was released in November 2022.

Synopsis

Volume One: Fantasy Heartbreaker

Volume Two: Split the Party

Volume Three: The Great Game

Volume Four: Bleed

Characters 
Paragons
 Dominic Ash: In the real world, Ash is a middle-aged man working in marketing. He is married to a woman named Sophie. He was best friends with Sol before they were transported to Die. In the world of Die, Ash lives as a woman. She plays the game as a Dictator, a diplomat character archetype represented by a 4-sided die. She has the ability to manipulate people's emotions and convince them to do her bidding with her words. During her time in Die as a teenager, Ash had numerous relationships with men, including an affair with Isabelle's lover Zamorna that resulted in an unexpected pregnancy. 
 Angela Ash: Ash's younger sister. In the real world, Angela is a coder who develops video games. She has two children and is in the process of divorcing her husband after having an affair with her co-worker Susan. In the world of Die, Angela plays as a Neo, a cyberpunk-inspired character archetype represented by a 10-sided die. She can gain control of machines and teleport herself, and she is able to manifest a robotic version of her childhood dog that acts as her companion. Her abilities are all powered by Fair gold, resulting in a dependence on the substance that is akin to addiction. As a teenager, she traded one of her arms for a cybernetic limb, which resulted in her losing an arm when she returned to the real world. 
 Isabelle: A Vietnamese-French adoptee who dated Sol when they were teenagers. She had a contentious relationship with Ash, made worse by the affair that Ash had with Zamorna. As an adult, Isabelle is divorced and teaches English literature at a high school. In the world of Die, she plays as a Godbinder, a character archetype represented by a 12-sided die. She is able to demand favors from twelve gods, each representing different elements and ideas, though she must perform favors for them in return. She strongly believes that the party should treat everyone in Die as if they are real and take responsibility for the consequences of their actions.
 Matt : Matt is a statistics professor with two daughters. His mother died when he was a teenager, leading to struggles with grief and depression. In the world of Die, he plays as a Grief Knight, a variant of an emotion-based character archetype represented by an 8-sided die. He carries a talking sword that verbalizes his worst fears and insecurities and becomes more powerful as he becomes sadder. Of all the members of the party, he is the most invested in leaving Die and returning home to his family. In Issue 14, Matt takes up a talking mace that symbolizes anger and becomes a dual-wielder of both Grief and Anger.
 Chuck: After leaving Die for the first time, Chuck became rich and famous writing popular fantasy novels. He has been married three times and is estranged from his children. In the world of Die, he plays as a Fool, a character archetype represented by a 6-sided die. As long as he maintains a carefree attitude and doesn't seriously consider consequences, he is granted an unusual degree of luck in all his actions. His recklessness and insincerity regularly antagonize the other members of the party.
 Solomon: Sol was Ash's best friend, and designed the game that led the party to Die as a gift for Ash. In the world of Die, he initially played as a Master, a character archetype equivalent to a gamemaster and represented by a 20-sided die. When the party made their first attempt to leave Die, an unexpected disruption resulted in Sol being left behind. He ended up becoming the Grandmaster of Die, ruthlessly controlling the rules governing all the realms instead of just one. Ash kills him after it becomes clear that he won't let the party return home, and he is resurrected as an undead Fallen. Fallen Sol is kept prisoner by Ash, who regularly interrogates him to try to uncover the true origins of Die.

Citizens of Die
Zamorna: The deposed vampire ruler of Angria, now in exile in Gondol. He was formerly the lover of both Isabelle and Ash, and fathered Augustus with Ash. Ash enchants him when they take over Angria to keep him under control. Zamorna is one of the characters created by the Brontë siblings as part of their fantasy worlds.
Augustus: The son of Zamorna and Ash and godchild of Isabelle and the Mourner. When Ash realized she was pregnant with him, she was afraid of the implications of his existence and what would happen to her and her baby if they returned to earth, leading Isabelle to ask the Mourner to carry him to term so that the Paragons could leave without strings.
Delighted & Dour: Two dwarves who can only feel the emotion they were named for. They befriend the party in Glass Town and join them throughout their adventures. Dour is killed in issue 15 protecting Chuck, and Delighted leads the Paragons to their final destiny.
Molly: Angela's eldest daughter, who reacted badly when Angela's affair with a coworker was revealed and her parents began divorce proceedings. Molly appears in Die as a Fallen, leading to concerns that time is passing faster on earth and that more people are being pulled into Die and subsequently dying.
The Elf Queen of the Dreaming Lands: An elven woman who initially appears to the party as an undead Fallen, and then later in her true form to Isabelle and Chuck. She is based on a former classmate of the Paragons when they were in school. Chuck sleeps with her real form but she leaves when Chuck says she isn't real and just a plaything, on top of not knowing her name. In the final issue, she gives a mission to the Fallen Chuck, who accepts on the condition that she tells him her name.
The Master of the Front: A man who appears to be J. R. R. Tolkien and who is now the unwilling Master of 'The Front', who believes that the Realm is a perversion of his stories. Unlike the other Masters, this echo does not directly claim to be the man who inspired him.
Charlotte Brontë: The Warden and Master of Angria, who claims to be the real Charlotte Brontë who was transported to Die upon her death. Charlotte and her siblings created the worlds of Gondal, Angria, Glass Town, and characters such as Zamorna in their childhood, but soon realized that they had gotten more than they bargained for when their worlds began to bleed into reality.
H. G. Wells: The Master of Little England, who reveals that he and the other Masters are merely 'echoes' of real-world creators who created pieces for Die. Wells is more involved in his realm than the other Masters, and believes that he successfully saved the world already by writing the book Little Wars. When Ash tells him that this didn't prevent World War I, Wells leaves in a time machine to try to stop it. He teams up with the Fair in a final attempt to stop Die and presumably dies during the attack.
H. P. Lovecraft: The Master of the Realm of Thirteen, an endless sea with an island and sub-dungeon based on Lovecraftian horror. He carved out his eyes after viewing the horrors of Die. This echo recalls that he once dreamed of non-Euclidean shapes and cults who revered his name, which are revealed to be futuristic premonitions of TTRPG dice and people playing the role-playing game based on his works, Call of Cthulhu. Isabelle kills him once he shows the Paragons the truth of the Fallen.
The Fair: Android-like fae creatures who act as Angela's patrons and provide her her Neo abilities. They choose whether to provide boons or not based on a coin-flip marked with binary. The Fair reveal that they arrived in Die in 1990 to try to stop Die's plan to merge with earth in 2020, and are killed in their final attempt after teaming up with H. G. Wells.

Publication history

Creative origins 
Gillen has stated that the idea for Die came from a conversation with his longtime collaborator Jamie McKelvie about the Dungeons & Dragons cartoon, in which a group of children are magically transported to the fantasy world of the tabletop role-playing game Dungeons & Dragons. The final episode of the show, in which the characters return to earth, was never produced, and Gillen wondered what might have happened to the children. Additionally, Gillen was inspired by Stephen King's horror novel It, and particularly the theme of adults returning to childhood experiences of horror. Die's focus on role-playing games and game mechanics was born from Gillen's own interest in role-playing games. He has stated that while he played RPGs for most of his life, his interest was reignited in 2013, when he started to seriously consider "the nature of fantasy, and where this weird form actually came from." These ideas became core themes in Die.

Gillen collaborated with artist Hans during his run on Journey into Mystery, after which they began discussing a collaboration on an ongoing comic. Hans had primarily worked as a cover artist, and Die was her first ongoing comic.

Ongoing series 
In September 2018, it was announced that the Die ongoing series by Gillen and Hans would be published by Image Comics. The series launched its first story arc in December 2018. In January 2019, the first issue received a third print run and the second issue received a second print run. Ultimately, the first issue received five print runs in total; every issue in the arc received additional print runs. In August 2019, the second story arc began with issue #6; per Diamond Comic Distributors, that issue was ranked #95 for "Total Unit Sales" for comic issues that month.

The release of third story arc was delayed due to the COVID-19 pandemic; it began with issue #11 released in June 2020. In February 2021, Gillen and Hans announced that the fourth story arc, titled Bleed, would be the final arc. The final arc began with issue #16 in May 2021 and finished with issue #20 in September 2021.

When asked if the intention of series was to run for twenty issues, Gillen stated: We've got the numbers on the d20 on the back. So, it was sort of implied that we weren't going past 20. 20 issues and four movements was always the plan. The first arc is the travel to try to get to Sol. [...] Then in the second arc, the party is split. We follow their separate paths before we end with them coming together and Ash taking over Angria becoming the quote-unquote evil queen. Then in the third arc, we have a high-level war between the various regions of Angria. So we've gone from one party to two parties working at separate ends to a Lord of the Rings-scale world war. Then the fourth arc was always going to be we're going down a fucking dungeon. It's obviously a joke because we're doing a Dungeons & Dragons-esque comic, and we haven't gone down a dungeon yet.A hardcover collection of the twenty issues is scheduled for release in November 2022.

DIE: The Roleplaying Game 
In 2018, Gillen announced that he was preparing a role-playing game based on Die. He has stated that his influences include the games Paranoia, Monsterhearts, Dungeon World, Legacy, Fiasco, Warhammer, and Dungeons & Dragons, as well as elements of Nordic LARP. Gillen developed the game and the comic concurrently; ideas he developed for one would then crossover into the other, such as the secret of the Fallen originated in the game. He stated, "I actually tend to think of the comic and the game way as two lenses of examining DIE. [...] It's also telling that when developing the game and writing the comic, ideas bounced between them freely. It was never me trying to adapt one to another, really. I was trying to do the idea as well as I could in two separate forms". When compared to the art of the comic series, Hans stated that the RPG art "will be a bit more full of detail and thoughts. My traditional painting style is not that far from digital art. [...] So, I don’t think it will be that different, but in the composition, of course, there will be some mock-up involved" and that "there are inspirations from the comics that I want to use for the RPG".

The original public beta version of the game was released for free online in June 2019 with the release of the trade paperback Die, Vol. 1: Fantasy Heartbreaker. Gillen also ran a closed beta to further develop the game. Gillen highlighted that his early playtesting began before the publication of the comic and that reading the comic is not required for playing the game as it is not "like a traditional licenced RPG book".

DIE: The Roleplaying Game was scheduled to launch on Kickstarter in October 2021, however, British publisher Rowan, Rook and Deckard later announced a delay due to concerns around shipping and material shortages. The official Kickstarter for the game launched on May 12, 2022; it was fully funded within 24 hours. DIE: The Roleplaying Game includes two main rulesets – DIE Core, rules for games two to four sessions long, and DIE Campaign, rules for longer ongoing games. DIE Core is an updated version of the public beta game. The digital edition was released to Kickstarter backers on October 25, 2022; the PDF became widely available on November 29, 2022.

Reception

In The Comics Journal, Mark Sable ranked the first issue as among the best comics of 2018, describing it as "the most memorable and accessible debut issue (he had) read in a long time". In 2019, Io9 called Die "subversive" and "a heady combination of fascinating worldbuilding (and) compellingly broken characters tearing each other apart", lauding Hans' "vivid, striking artwork".

At the review aggregator website Comic Book Roundup, which assigns a weighted mean rating out of 10 to reviews from comics critics, the entire series received an average score of 9.4 based on 202 reviews. Chase Magnett, for ComicBook.com in 2021, wrote that "the arrival of DIE #20 is a bittersweet moment. Over the past 3 years, DIE established itself as one of the most engaging and wondrously conceived series in serialized American comics. Each issue read like a gift and engaged all of the facets that made this concept sing: richly-considered characters, fascinating settings and conflicts, a rigorous consideration of humanity's use of games and stories, and some of the most stunning artwork found in any comic from 2021. [...] So whether you're finally coming to DIE as it concludes or, like many of us here at ComicBook, tensely awaiting one last issue, there has never been a better time to discover one of the absolute best comics series in years".

Christian Holub, in his 2021 review of Die, Vol. 4: Bleed for Entertainment Weekly, commented that "it's always nice to see a creative team stick the landing. [...] The conclusion is fulfilling and satisfactory, so it feels like we can now confirm Die as a very good comic, one of the best mainstream offerings in years. Hans' painterly art makes Die look uniquely distinguished from every other fantasy series on the shelf, and proves more than capable of tackling the many, many different kinds of stories Gillen brings into their orbit. [...] Anyone who found themselves intrigued by Die's initial premise owes it to themselves to read all four volumes".

In terms of sales, both the individual issues and the trade paperbacks were consistently bestsellers. Bleeding Cool highlighted that "while it's unusual for monthly titles to increase in sales following #1", from the third issue every initial order for each issue in the first arc was higher than the previous issue and "Die #6 has the highest initial orders for an issue of Die since #1". Die, Vol. 1: Fantasy Heartbreaker was #1 in "units shipped" and #9 in "dollars invoiced" on Diamond's "Best-Selling Graphic Novels" sales list for June 2019. Die, Vol. 2: Split The Party was #2 in "units shipped" and #6 in "dollars invoiced" on Diamond's "Best-Selling Graphic Novels" sales list for February 2020. Die, Vol. 3: The Great Game was #4 in "units shipped" and #6 in "dollars invoiced" on Diamond's "Best-Selling Graphic Novels" sales list for December 2020. Die, Vol. 4: Bleed was #4 in "units shipped" and #11 in "dollars invoiced" on Diamond's "Best-Selling Graphic Novels" sales list for November 2021. In January 2022, all four trade paperbacks were on Diamond's "Top 400 Comic Books" for graphic novel sales – volume one was #121, volume four was #208, volume two was #263 and volume three was #323.

DIE: The Roleplaying Game was included on Gizmodo's "The 20 Best Tabletop Roleplaying Games of 2022" list — Linda Codega commented that it is "probably the game that I am most hyped to receive in physical form" and that the game "is a meta-textual love letter to gaming, storytelling, and their own comic creation. [...] It combines a very clever premise with the ability to do pretty much anything you want, but the consequences, the final decision, always looms large in the minds of you and your companions".

Awards

Collected editions

References

External links
Official site
Open beta for the Die role-playing game

Image Comics titles
Books about role-playing games
LGBT-related comics
Portal fantasy